The Fontana Maggiore, a masterpiece of medieval sculpture, placed in the centre of Piazza IV Novembre (formerly Piazza Grande), is the monument symbol of the city of Perugia.

History 
The monumental fountain was designed by Frà Bevignate da Cingoli and built between 1275 and 1277 to celebrate the arrival of water in the acropolis of the city, by means of the new aqueduct. Bevignate cooperated with other talented professionals, as Boninsegna Veneziano, a hydraulic engineer, who accomplished an incredible audacious endeavour, being able to carry the water coming from monte Pacciano, located a few kilometres, without the help of pumps. By means of a forced pressure duct, he managed to give to the water the opposite movement, i.e., the water flowed uphill instead of downhill. 

Another co-worker was the melter Rosso Padellaio, who created the bronze upper part of the fountain. The marble tiles were placed from 1278, carved by the most important sculptors of the period: Nicola Pisano, who studied at the Scuola foggiana di architettura e scultura di Federico II (the school in Foggia Federico II, specialized in architecture and sculpture) in partnership with Giovanni, his son. 

The fountain was damaged by the earthquake of 1348, with the subsequent random reconstruction of the tile order; it was refurbished the first time in 1948/49 and then again in 1995/99. 

The fountain inspired Jacopo di Grondalo for the construction of the fountain Sturinalto of Fabriano in 1285. 

In the early 20th century, the fountain was refurbished by the architect Giuseppe Sacconi.

Description 

The fountain was prepared in a workshop and then assembled in the centre of the square; it was made of stone from Assisi. The fountain consists of two concentric polygonal marble basins, on top a bronze cup (by the artisan Rosso Padellaio from Perugia) decorated with a coloured bronze group of feminine figures (perhaps nymphs) out of which comes the water.  

The lower basin is made up of 25 mirrors, each divided into 2 tiles that describe the 12 months of the year, each of which is related to a zodiac symbol. Each month is connected to scenes of daily life and the farming work that characterize it. As in other contemporary sculptures from Europe, in which the months are represented, here the manual work obtains dignity. In this basin manual labour is in fact represented together with the arti liberali (liberal arts), with philosophy, with characters from the Bible and the history of Rome; in this specific order: 

 The month of January (a gentleman and his wife at the hearth – Aquarius) 
 The month of February (two fishermen - Pisces) 
 The month of March (the “spinario” and the pruning of the vineyard - Aries) 
 The month of April (two allegories of spring - Taurus)  

 The month of May (two Knights on Falconry - Gemini) 
 The month of June (the harvest and flailing - Cancer) 
 The month of July (the threshing and the division of wheat - Lion) 
 The month of August (the fig harvest - Virgo) 
 The month of September (the crushing of must - Libra and the grape harvest) 

 The month of October (the filling up of casks - Scorpion and the construction of casks) 
 The month of November (the ploughing - Sagittarius and the sowing) 
 The month of December (the slaughter of the pork - Capricorn) 
 The Lion Guelph and the Griffin of Perugia 
 Grammar and Dialectic 

 Rhetoric and Arithmetic 
 Geometry and Music 
 Astronomy and Philosophy 
 Two eagles, on the right one the signature of Giovanni Pisano 
 The Original Sin and the expulsion from Eden 

 Samson kills the Lion and Samson and Dalila 
 Davide triumphant and Golia defeated 
 Romulus and Remus (represented as two falconers) 
 The she-wolf that fed Romulus, Remus and their mother Rea Silvia 
 Two of Aesop's fables (the fox and the crane and the wolf and the lamb) 

In the upper basin, 24 statues at the corners, representing saints and mythological and biblical characters from the New and Old Testament. As in the lower basin, there is no contrast between the new Judeo-Cristian civilization and the ancient Greek-Roman civilization, they are harmonized and placed in continuity. The basin can be seen as a wind rose, where at each cardinal point there are relevant characters; i.e., the representation of Augusta Perusia with the cornucopia on her lap, which draw nourishment from the ears of wheat brought by the lady of Chiusi (once the granary of Perugia) and from the fish offered by Domina Iacus, the nymph of the Lake Trasimeno. Then follows all the characters related to the city. In the opposite cardinal point, to the North, Euliste, the legendary founder of Perugia. To the West, Rome, related to the representation of the Roman Church and of Divinitas Excelsa and of Saints Pietro and Paolo. Another important character to the East is S. Giovanni Battista, for the role of the water as an essential and sacred element; it is associated with Salomè and other biblical characters. 

The representation of the 24 statues are: 

 San Pietro 

 The Church of Rome 
 Roma caput mundi (Rome capital of the world) 
 Divinitas Excelsa  
 San Paolo 
 A Cleric of San Lorenzo 

 San Lorenzo, patron saint of the city 
 The nymph of the territory of Chiusi or Domina Clusi 
 Augusta Perusia 
 The nymph of Trasimeno or Domina lacus, who offers the fish to Perugia 
 San Ercolano, patron saint of the city 

 The Cleric traitor of San Ercolano 
 Saint Benedict  
 John the Baptist 
 Solomon 
 David 
 Salomè  
 Mosè 
 Matteo da Correggio, podestà of Perugia 
 The Archangel Michele 
 Euliste, the legendary founder of Perugia 
 Melchisedec 
 Ermanno da Sassoferrato, capitano del Popolo 
 The Victory 

In the lower frame of the second basins, Latin verses are carved; epigraphic abbreviation provides information on the authors and the date of the sculpture, and they are an invitation to examine and interpret the fountain: “Guarda tu che passi questa fontana dal lieto mormorio, se osservi bene puoi vedere cose mirabili….” (Look, you who pass by this fountain with its babbling, if you look closer you can see wonderful things.)

Stamp 
In 1974, the Poste Italiane (Italian Posts) dedicated to Fontana Maggiore a 40 Lire stamp (ex-Italian currency), for the collection “Fontane d’Italia”(Italian fountains).

See also 
 Piazza IV Novembre
 Sturinalto

References

Bibliography 
 
 

Buildings and structures completed in 1278
Maggiore
Buildings and structures in Perugia
Tourist attractions in Umbria